Johannesburg (foaled on February 23, 1999) is a Kentucky-bred United States and European Champion Thoroughbred racehorse.

Background
Johannesburg was trained by Aidan O'Brien at Ballydoyle.

Racing career
Johannesburg was unbeaten as a 2-year-old, winning 7 races, 4 of them Group 1s, including the Phoenix Stakes, Prix Morny, Middle Park Stakes and Breeders' Cup Juvenile. For his performances in the 2001 racing season, he earned the Cartier Award for Two-Year-Old European Champion Colt.

He had 3 starts as a 3-year-old, including an 8th-place finish in the Kentucky Derby and 9th in the Golden Jubilee Stakes at Royal Ascot.

Stud record
Johannesburg was retired to the Ashford Stud near Versailles, Kentucky, the American arm of the giant Irish breeder Coolmore Stud. For a time, he shuttled between Ashford Stud and Coolmore Australia near Jerrys Plains, New South Wales for the Southern Hemisphere breeding season, but as of 2009 stood exclusively in Kentucky.  In October 2009 he was sold to Shizunai Stallion Station on the island of  Hokkaido, Japan. His progeny include the Group 2 winner Hamoody and Scat Daddy, winner of the 2007 Grade I Florida Derby and sire of 2018 Triple Crown winner Justify. He also sired Group 1 AJC Oaks and Group 2 ATC Chairmans Handicap winner Once Were Wild when at stud in Australia.  His other top runners include grade II winner Teuflesberg, French group I winner Sageburg, and Australian group I winner Turffontein and a total of 69 stakes winners.

Pedigree

References

1999 racehorse births
Racehorses bred in Kentucky
Racehorses trained in Ireland
Breeders' Cup Juvenile winners
Cartier Award winners
Eclipse Award winners
Thoroughbred family 2-f